Oligomerus is a genus of death-watch beetles in the family Ptinidae. There are about 18 described species in Oligomerus.

Identification
It leaves a round hole behind, which is one to three millimeters in diameter. The boreholes are filled with loose bore dust. Its excrement looks like "salt and pepper".

Species
These 18 species belong to the genus Oligomerus:

 Oligomerus alternans LeConte, 1865 i c g b
 Oligomerus angusticollis White, 1976 i c g
 Oligomerus brevipilis Fall, 1905 i c g
 Oligomerus brunneus (Olivier, 1790) g
 Oligomerus californicus Fall, 1905 i c g
 Oligomerus crestonensis Hatch, 1961 i c g
 Oligomerus cylindricus White, 1976 i c g
 Oligomerus delicatulus (Fall, 1920) i c g
 Oligomerus disruptus (Baudi di Selve, 1874) g
 Oligomerus enervatus White, 1976 i c g
 Oligomerus grossus White, 1976 i c g
 Oligomerus obtusus LeConte, 1865 i c g
 Oligomerus priapus White, 1976 i c g
 Oligomerus ptilinoides (Wollaston, 1854) g
 Oligomerus retowskii Schilsky, 1898 g
 Oligomerus sericans (Melsheimer, 1846) i c g b
 Oligomerus tenellus Fall, 1905 i c g
 Oligomerus texanus White, 1976 i c g

Data sources: i = ITIS, c = Catalogue of Life, g = GBIF, b = Bugguide.net

References

External links

 
 

Ptinidae